Mangal Singh Dhillon, better known as Mangal Dhillon is an Indian actor, writer, director and film producer. He was born in Wander Jatana near Kotkapura in Faridkot district, Punjab.

Early life
He was born in a Sikh family in a village Wander Jatana, in Faridkot district of the Indian state of Punjab. He studied in Panj Graayin Kalan Government school until 4th Standard. He then moved to Uttar Pradesh near his father's farm. He graduated from Zila Parishad high school in Nighasan, Lakhimpur Kheri district. He then returned to Punjab where he completed his higher secondary from Kot Kapura. He graduated from Muktsar Government College.

He worked in theatre in Delhi and joined Indian Theatre department at Panjab University, Chandigarh in 1979 and completed his post-graduate diploma course in acting in 1980.

Filmography

Television

Feature films

Production house
Dhillon formed a production company and released a well-received historical film entitled Khalsa. His other productions include  A Day at the Golden Temple-(about the 24 hours holy practice every day)", Prakash Sri Guru Granth Sahib (in 2004 about the uniqueness of Guru Granth Sahib), Sikh Ate Dastaar, The Inseparable-A Sikh and his Turban, (about the unbreakable bond of every Sikh with his turban & long hair) Sarvnash-(in 2007 against drug abuse) Gurbani De Kautak Part-1 and Part-2 (in 2009-10 about the divine healing powers of Gurbani) Toshakhana Sri Darbar Sahib (about the priceless articles kept at Toshakhana) and Ḧarinam Ke Chamatkar (a documentary about the divine healing powers of Harinam).

Forth coming projects include Shahadat (a feature film, about politics of votes & countless other social issues of Punjab, India & NRIs), Ä Western Salutation to Sikhism (about the devotion, faith & conviction of western people who embraced sikhism) Saaka-Sarhind (a docu-drama film about the martyrdom of the sons of Sri Guru Gobind Singh ji), and Gurbani De Kautak Parts 3, 4 and 5 (documentary films about the divine healing powers of spiritual hymns of Sri Guru Granth Sahib)and many others.

Awards
 For his role in television serial Junoon, he won the RAPA (Radio and Television Advertising Practitioners' Association) award for best actor in 1998. 
 He was honored with Baba Farid Award by Punjab Government for the film Khalsa 
 An outstanding achievement award from Chief Minister Punjab in 2006 as well as various other recognitions from organizations all over Punjab and abroad.
 He was awarded the Mohan Rakesh Gold Medal for best actor.

References

External links
 
 
 Sikh Article on Mangal Dhillon
 https://www.tribuneindia.com/2001/20010503/main8.htm

Punjabi people
Indian Sikhs
Living people
Male actors in Hindi cinema
Male actors in Punjabi cinema
People from Lakhimpur Kheri
People from Punjab, India
People from Faridkot district
20th-century Indian male actors
Male actors from Punjab, India
Indian male stage actors
21st-century Indian male actors
Year of birth missing (living people)